Alexander L. Harris (October 9, 1820 – August 27, 1898) was a Democratic mayor of Kansas City, Missouri, in 1866 and 1868.

Biography
Harris was born in either Tennessee or Kentucky. He operated a saloon near the Missouri River levee and was councilman from the first ward in 1861–1862.

He was elected mayor in 1866, failed re-election in 1867, and was elected again in 1868.

In 1870 was a deputy sheriff for Jackson County, Missouri, and became a county commissioner (called county judge) in 1871.

References

1820 births
1898 deaths
County commissioners in Missouri
Missouri Democrats
People from Jackson County, Missouri
Mayors of Kansas City, Missouri
Burials at Union Cemetery, Kansas City, Missouri
19th-century American politicians